Triple Crossed  is a 1959 short subject directed by Jules White starring American slapstick comedy team The Three Stooges (Moe Howard, Larry Fine and Joe Besser). It is the 189th entry in the series released by Columbia Pictures starring the comedians, who released 190 shorts for the studio between 1934 and 1959.

Plot
Larry is a womanizer who is having an affair with Moe's wife Belle (Mary Ainslee). At the same time, he is also making eyes at Joe's fiancee, Millie (Angela Stevens). However, Moe tracks down the conniving Larry at his pet shop, and gives him the works before Larry calms him down. Realizing he needs to cover his tracks, Larry looks for a "fall guy" in the form of Joe. Larry then gets Joe a job as an underwear salesman and the first place he goes is Moe's home.

While Joe is modeling his ware, Larry lies to Moe about Joe's advances on Millie. Both of them go storming over to Moe's, while Joe flees up the chimney. After making a quiet getaway, Joe bumps into Larry, and turns him in. Joe later drags Larry and explains to Moe how Larry had set him up.  Millie reveals how Larry had tricked her into coming there.  Moe tells her Larry had tricked him, too.  Millie and Joe make up while an angry Moe punishes Larry.

Cast

Credited
 Moe Howard as Moe
 Larry Fine as Larry
 Joe Besser as Joe
 Angela Stevens as Millie
 Mary Ainsley as Belle (stock footage)
 Connie Cezon as Belle (new footage)
 Diana Darrin as Miss Lapdale (stock footage)

Uncredited
 Johnny Kascier as Waiter (stock footage)

Production notes
Triple Crossed is a remake of 1952's He Cooked His Goose, using ample stock footage. New footage was filmed on December 12–13, 1957.<ref>[https://threestooges.net/filmography/episode/188 Triple Crossed at threestooges.net]</ref>

When Moe shoots at Joe up the chimney, Shemp Howard's yell from He Cooked His Goose can be heard. In a cost-saving measure, Joe Besser's voice was not dubbed over Shemp's for authenticity. In addition, when Larry is walking in the hallway from the elevator to meet Moe’s wife, Joe is hiding in the closet wearing a Santa Claus outfit; however, it is Shemp who is whistling at Larry. Also, Shemp’s face can be seen in the background peeking from underneath the bearskin rug and can be seen when he opens the janitor closet door and slams Larry in the hallway.

Over the course of their 24 years at Columbia Pictures, the Stooges would occasionally be cast as separate characters. This course of action always worked against the team; author Jon Solomon concluded "when the writing divides them, they lose their comic dynamic." In addition to this split occurring in Triple Crossed (as well as He Cooked His Goose, the film it originated from), the trio also played separate characters in Rockin' in the Rockies, Cuckoo on a Choo Choo, Gypped in the Penthouse, Flying Saucer Daffy and Sweet and Hot''.

References

External links 
 
 
Triple Crossed at threestooges.net

1959 films
1959 comedy films
The Three Stooges films
American black-and-white films
The Three Stooges film remakes
Films directed by Jules White
Columbia Pictures short films
1950s English-language films
1950s American films